This is a list of episodes for the OVA series Legend of the Galactic Heroes. In-universe dates are given in the Space Calendar (S.C.) used in the Free Planets Alliance and the Imperial Calendar (I.C.) used in the Galactic Empire.

Series overview

Chronological order of episodes and films
Spiral Labyrinth (Gaiden 2, episodes 1-14)
Silver-White Valley (Gaiden 1, episodes 1-4)
The Mutineer (G2, ep. 15-18)
The Duelist (G2, ep. 19-22)
Golden Wings
The Retriever (G2, ep. 23-26)
Dream of the Morning, Song of Night (G1, ep. 5-8)
A Hundred Billion Stars, a Hundred Billion Lights (G1, ep. 13-24)
The Third Tiamat Battle (G2, ep. 27-28)
My Conquest is the Sea of Stars
Disgrace (G1, ep. 9-12)
Overture to a New War (an expanded retelling of the first two episodes of the main OVA series)
Main OVA series

First part (Season 1)

The first part (or season 1) covers volumes 1 and 2 of the original novels, adding two stories from the prequel novel The Star Crusher (episodes 9 and 11) and an original story (parts of episodes 13 and 14). The main theme is Reinhard von Lohengramm's rise to power, mirrored by Yang Wen-li's unwillingness to go beyond his military duties and assume a similar position in the Free Planets Alliance.

Second part (Season 2)

The 28-episode second part (or season 2) covers volumes 3 to 5 of the original novels. Reinhard von Lohengramm achieves almost all his goals: the Goldenbaum dynasty is finally overthrown and the Free Planets Alliance is defeated and occupied. One of the main themes is the comparison between a corrupt democracy and an efficient dictatorship and the moral issues of such a situation, with Yang Wen-li standing for democracy because a corrupt democracy can be amended, while a dictatorship can only be overthrown by force, and a wise dictator is an exception.

Third part (Season 3)

The 32-episode third part (or season 3) covers volumes 6 to 8 of the original novels.

Fourth part (Season 4) 

The 24-episodes fourth part (or season 4) covers volumes 9 and 10 of the original novels.

Episodes
Legend of the Galactic Heroes